The following is a list of major assets that are owned by Paramount Global.

Paramount Pictures Corporation (film) 
 Paramount Pictures
 Paramount Home Entertainment
 Paramount Television Studios
 Paramount Pictures International
 Paramount Studio Group – physical studio and post production
 The Studios at Paramount – production facilities & lot
 Paramount on Location – production support facilities throughout North America including New York, Vancouver, and Atlanta
 Worldwide Technical Operations – archives, restoration and preservation programs, the mastering and distribution fulfillment services, on-lot post production facilities management
 Paramount Licensing, Inc.
 Paramount Parks & Resorts – licensing and design for parks and resorts
 Paramount Themed Entertainment
 Paramount Animation
 Paramount Players
 BET Films
 Nickelodeon Movies
 Paramount Music
 Miramax (49%, co-owned with beIN Media Group)
 Miramax Television
 Miramax Family
 Miramax Animation
 United International Pictures (50%, with NBCUniversal via Universal Pictures)
 Rede Telecine (12.5% each with Disney via Disney Studios, NBCUniversal via Universal Studios, MGM Holdings via Metro-Goldwyn-Mayer; 50% with Grupo Globo via Canais Globo)

CBS Entertainment Group 
 CBS Television Network
 CBS Studios
 Big Ticket Television
 CBS Media Ventures
 CBS Media Ventures Media Sales
 Dabl
 CBS Eye Animation Productions 
 Late Night Cartoons, Inc.
 CBS News and Stations
 CBS News
 CBS News Streaming Network
 CBS News Radio
 CBS MoneyWatch
 See It Now Studios
 CBS television stations
 KCBS-TV 2 / KCAL-TV 9 Los Angeles
 KOVR 13 / KMAX-TV 31 Sacramento – Stockton – Modesto, California
 KPIX-TV 5 / KBCW 44 San Francisco – Oakland – San Jose, California
 KCNC-TV 4 Denver, Colorado
 WFOR-TV 4 / WBFS-TV 33 Miami–Fort Lauderdale, Florida
 WTOG 44 St. Petersburg – Tampa, Florida
 WUPA 69 Atlanta
 WBBM-TV 2 Chicago
 WBXI-CD 47 Indianapolis
 WJZ-TV 13 Baltimore
 WBZ-TV 4 / WSBK-TV 38 Boston
 WWJ-TV 62 / WKBD-TV 50 Detroit / Windsor, Ontario
 WCCO-TV 4 / KCCW-TV 12 Minneapolis–Saint Paul — Walker, Minnesota
 WCBS-TV 2 / WLNY-TV 55 Riverhead – New York City
 KYW-TV 3 / WPSG 57 Philadelphia
 KDKA-TV 2 / WPCW 19 Jeannette – Pittsburgh, Pennsylvania
 KTVT 11 / KTXA 21 Fort Worth – Dallas
 KSTW 11 Tacoma – Seattle
 Start TV (50% JV with Weigel Broadcasting)
 Fave TV
 CBS Local Digital Media

 CBS News New York
 CBS News Los Angeles
 CBS News Boston
 CBS News Bay Area
 CBS News Minnesota
 CBS News Philadelphia
 CBS News Colorado
 CBS News Pittsburgh
 CBS News Chicago
 CBS News Texas
 CBS News Sacramento
 CBS News Baltimore
 CBS News Miami
 CBS Local Sports
 CBS Sports
 CBS Sports Network
 CBS Sports HQ
 CBS Sports Radio
 CBS Sports Digital
 247Sports
 MaxPreps
 The CW (12.5% each with Warner Bros. Discovery; 75% ownership to Nexstar Media Group)
 The CW Plus
 The CW Daytime
 CW Seed
 CBS Home Entertainment
 Watch! Magazine
 CBS Vision
 BET Media Group
 BET
 BET Gospel
 BET Her
 BET Hip-Hop
 BET Jams
 BET Soul
 BET Studios 
 BET Interactive
 VH1
 BET+

Paramount Media Networks

MTV Entertainment Group 
 MTV Entertainment Studios
 MTV Animation Inc.
 MTV Documentary Films
 South Park Digital Studios (joint venture with Trey Parker and Matt Stone)
 MTV
 MTV2
 MTV Classic
 MTV Live
 MTVU
 Tr3s
 Comedy Central
 Comedy Central Now
 Comedy Central Records
 CMT
 CMT Music
 Logo
 Paramount Network
 Pop TV
 Smithsonian Channel
 TV Land

Showtime Networks 
 Showtime
 Showtime 2
 Showcase
 SHO×BET
 Showtime Extreme
 Showtime Family Zone
 Showtime Next
 Showtime Women
 The Movie Channel
 The Movie Channel Xtra
 Flix
 Showtime Documentary Films
 Showtime PPV
 Showtime Digital, Inc.

Kids & Family Entertainment 
 Nickelodeon
 Nick at Nite
 Nick Jr.
 Nicktoons
 TeenNick
 NickMusic
 Nick.com
 NickOnBoard - a cruise-line-only television channel launched in April 14, 2019.
 Nickelodeon Productions
 Nickelodeon Animation Studio
 Avatar Studios
 Nickelodeon Digital
 Nickelodeon Movies
 Nickelodeon Velocity 
 Paws, Inc.
 Awesomeness
 Awesomeness Ink
 Awesomeness Films
 Awesomeness News

Paramount International Networks

United Kingdom & Australia 
 Channel 5
 5Action
 5Select
 5Star
 5USA
 My5 (VOD)
 Ten Network Holdings
 Network 10
 ATV Melbourne
 TEN Sydney
 TVQ Brisbane
 ADS Adelaide
 NEW Perth
 10 Peach
 10 Bold
 10 Shake
 10 HD
 10 Play
 Gecko TV (channel 17)

The Americas 
Chilevisión
Telefe
 Telefe Internacional
 Telefe Rosario
 Telefe Neuquén
 Telefe Córdoba
 Telefe Mar del Plata
 Telefe Tucumán
 Telefe Bahía Blanca
 Telefe Salta
 Telefe Santa Fe
 Porta dos Fundos (51%)
TeleColombia (majority stake)
Estudios TeleMéxico

EMEAA 
 Ananey Communications
 Ego
 The Food Channel
 The Travel Channel
 The Good Life Channel
 Health Channel
 Hot Comedy Central
 Nutz Productions
 Shamaim Productions
 Mars Interactive
 Post Office Post Production & Creative
 BET France
 Game One
 J-One
 Paramount Comedy (Ukraine)
 Paramount Network (international channels)
 Super!

Joint ventures 
 RealityXtra (with AMC Networks International UK)
 CBS Europa (Poland; with AMC Networks International)
 CBS Reality (with AMC Networks International)
 Legend (with AMC Networks International UK)

Paramount Streaming 
 CBS Sports HQ
 CBS News Streaming Network
 ET Live (broadcast syndicator)
 Noggin
 Paramount+
 SkyShowtime (joint venture with Comcast's Sky Group)
 Showtime (OTT)
 Pluto TV
 Pluto TV Europe

Simon & Schuster
 Simon & Schuster Adult Publishing
 Adams Media located in Avon, Massachusetts
 Atria Publishing Group
 37 INK
 Atria Books
 Atria Español
 Atria Unbound
 Beyond Words Publishing
 Black Privilege Publishing
 Emily Bestler Books
 Enliven Books
 Howard Books
 One Signal Publishers
 Strebor Books International
 Washington Square Press
 Avid Reader Press
 Gallery Books Group
 Gallery Books
 Jeter Publishing
 Pocket Books
 Pocket Star
 Scout Press
 Threshold Editions
 Scribner 
 Scribner
 Touchstone
 Simon & Schuster (the flagship imprint)
 Folger Shakespeare Library
 Free Press
 Simon & Schuster Children's Publishing
 Aladdin
 Atheneum
 Beach Lane Books
 Little Simon
 Margaret K. McElderry Books
 Paula Wiseman Books
 Saga Press 
 Salaam Reads
 Simon & Schuster Books for Young Readers
 Simon Pulse
 Simon Spotlight
 Simon & Schuster Audio Publishing
 Simon & Schuster Audio
 Pimsleur Language Programs
 Simon & Schuster International
 Simon & Schuster Australia
 Simon & Schuster Canada
 Simon & Schuster India
 Simon & Schuster UK

Miscellaneous holdings 
 Bellator MMA
 Bellator Kickboxing
Last.fm
 CBS Broadcast Center
 CBS Experiences Inc.
 CBS Sporting Club
 CBS Stages Canada
 CBS VFX
 Ed Sullivan Theater
FuboTV (undisclosed stake)
 Paramount Consumer Products
VidCon
 Paramount Global Content Distribution
 Philo (joint venture with A+E Networks, AMC Networks, and Warner Bros. Discovery)
  Pop Culture Media
 ComicBook.com
 PopCulture.com
 Velocity
 Viacom18 (49%; co-owned with TV18) - renamed as 18 Paramount soon
 Viacom18 US
 Viacom18 Media
 Colors
 Viacom18 Studios
 The Indian Film Company
 Voot
 WhoSay

Former assets

Divested 
 AXS TV (20%) – sold to Anthem Sports & Entertainment in 2019
 HDNet Movies
 Blockbuster LLC – spun off in 2004
 DEJ Productions
 Discovery Zone
 GameRush
 Gamestation
 KPS Video Express
 Xtra-vision
 CBS Building – purchased by Harbor Group International in 2021
 CBS/Columbia Records – sold to Sony in 1987, renamed Sony Music Entertainment in 1991
 CBS Records International
 Columbia House
 CBS Music Publishing – sold to SBK Entertainment World in 1986
 CBS Educational and Professional Publishing – sold to Harcourt Brace Jovanovich in 1986
 Praeger Publishers – sold to Greenwood Press, Inc.
 CBS Eye on People – acquired by Discovery Communications in 1998/1999
 CBS/Fox Video
 CBS Musical Instruments
 CBS Operations Inc.
 CBS Outdoor (now Outfront Media) – spun off into an independent real estate investment trust in 2014
 CBS Outdoor International – sold to Platinum Equity in 2013
 CBS Outernet – renamed Outfront Media Outernet
 CBS Radio – merged with Entercom (former CBS Corporation shareholders received a 72% stake in Entercom)
List of broadcast stations owned by CBS Radio
 Boston Bruins Radio
 CBS Altitude Group
 Eventful
 New York Yankees Radio
 New York Yankees
 Play.it
 Radio.com
 CBS Records
 CBS Studio Center – sold to Hackman Capital Partners and Square Mile Capital Management in 2021
 CBS Telenoticias
 CBS Television City – sold to Hackman Capital Partners in 2018
 CNET Media Group – sold to Red Ventures in 2020
 CNET
 CNET Video
 Download.com
 CNET Content Solutions
 Chowhound
 GameSpot
 Comic Vine
 GameFAQs
 Giant Bomb
 Metacritic
 MetroLyrics
 TV Guide
 ZDNet
 TechRepublic
 Decades (50%, with Weigel Broadcasting) – Since fall 2019, Decades is carried on Fox-owned stations in 12 markets as part of a multi-year agreement between Weigel Broadcasting and Fox Television Stations, after switching from CBS-owned stations.
 DreamWorks Pictures – spun off in 2008, currently a label of Amblin Partners. However Paramount retains the rights to the studio's pre-2010 back-catalog.
 DreamWorks Television – television production division of DreamWorks.
 Go Fish Pictures – indie film label, shut down in 2007.
 Epix – Metro-Goldwyn-Mayer acquired Viacom's stake in the network in 2017
 Famous Music – in-house music publishing arm of Paramount Pictures, sold to Sony/ATV Music Publishing in 2007
 Famous Players – sold to Cineplex Galaxy in 2005
 Paramount Theater
 SilverCity
 Colossus
 Coliseum
 Fox-Paramount Home Entertainment (Nordic countries, joint venture with Walt Disney Studios Home Entertainment) - shut down in 2020
 GameTrailers – sold to Defy Media; later shut down and sold to IGN
 Home Team Sports – sold to Comcast in 2000/2001 and renamed Comcast SportsNet Mid-Atlantic
 Harmonix
 Ideal Toy Company– sold to View-Master in 1986
 Creative Playthings – sold to Swing Design
 KVMM-CD – sold to HC2 Holdings in 2019
 Lifetime – Viacom sold its stake to co-owners Hearst Communications and Capital Cities/ABC Inc. in 1994
 Midwest Sports Channel – acquired by News Corporation in 2000 and renamed Fox Sports Net North
 Multi Channel Network – 24.99% stake held by Ten Network Holdings sold to Foxtel on January 1, 2019
 MTV Networks on Campus – acquired by Cheddar in May 2018 and used to launch CheddarU
 Neopets – acquired by JumpStart Games in 2014
 Paramount Parks
 Prentice Hall – sold to Pearson in 1998
 RateMyProfessors.com – acquired by Cheddar in October 2018
 RTL CBS Entertainment – joint venture with RTL Group; acquired by Blue Ant Media and renamed Blue Ant Entertainment
 RTL CBS Extreme – renamed Blue Ant Extreme
 Orion Pictures - other stake acquired by Viacom in 1986, subsequently it sold to Metromedia in 1987; currently owned by Amazon (through MGM Holdings).
 Rainbow S.p.A. – 30% stake purchased by Viacom in 2011 re-acquired by Iginio Straffi in 2023
 Gruppo Iven S.p.A.
 Colorado Film
 Bardel Entertainment
 Rainbow CGI
 Moviement Talent Agency
 Witty Toys
 Tridimensional S.r.l.
 Rysher Entertainment – assets sold to 2929 Entertainment in 2001; library currently owned by Vine Alternative Investments and distributed by Paramount Global Distribution Group
 Showtime Arabia – 21%; co-owned with KIPCO; merged with Orbit Communications Company to form Orbit Showtime Network
 Sundance Channel (now Sundance TV) – sold to Rainbow Media (now AMC Networks) in 2008
 Telemeter — spun off in 1966 after Gulf+Western bought Paramount; shut down in 1969
 Tempo – sold to Frederick Morton Jr. in 2007
 TriStar Pictures – joint venture with Time Inc.'s HBO and Columbia Pictures. In 1985, CBS sold a small percent of TriStar to Columbia and HBO.
 USA Networks – Viacom sold its stake in the company to Universal Pictures in 1997
 Viacom Cable – sold to TCI in 1995; Ohio systems resold to Time Warner Cable in 1998
 Viacom Radio
 Virgin Interactive Entertainment – US branch sold to Electronic Arts in 1998 and UK branch sold to Interplay Entertainment and Titus Interactive in 1998/1999
 Westwood One – sold to The Gores Group in 2008
 Viacom International Inc. – copyright holder of MTV, VH1, and Nickelodeon content
 Westinghouse Licensing Corporation - spin off in 2021
 Xfire

Dormant or shuttered 
Paramount Pictures
 DreamWorks Distribution, LLC – theatrical distribution arm of DreamWorks Pictures and DreamWorks Animation
 DreamWorks Home Entertainment – folded into Paramount Home Entertainment
 DW Funding LLC – library holder of live-action DreamWorks films
 Famous Studios (later Paramount Cartoon Studios) – closed after Gulf+Western's acquisition of Paramount Pictures in 1967
 Fleischer Studios – acquired by Paramount Pictures and reorganized as Famous Studios in 1942
 Insurge Pictures
 Liberty Films
 Melange Pictures, LLC – library holder of Republic Pictures films
 Budd Rogers Releasing Corporation
 Commonwealth United Entertainment
 The Landau-Unger Company
 Astor Pictures
 United Pictures Corporation
 The Enterprise Studios
 Spelling Films
 Taft International Pictures
 Sunn Classic Pictures
 Paramount Comics – partnership with Marvel Comics for comics based on Paramount's film library
 Paramount Digital Entertainment
 Paramount Famous Productions
 Paramount Vantage/Paramount Classics
 Screenlife Games
 Wilshire Court Productions – made-for-TV movie division; library sold to CBS Corporation in 2006
 Paramount DVD
 Paramount High Definition
 Paramount Worldwide Television Licensing & Distribution – folded into Paramount Global Content Distribution

TV Entertainment (CBS Group)
 CBS Cable
 CBS Cable Networks - folded into Viacom Media Networks and renamed ViacomCBS Domestic Media Networks
 CBS Connections
 CBS Consumer Products — founded in 2009; folded into Nickelodeon & Viacom Consumer Products forming 

Other assets
 CBS EcoMedia
 CBS EYE Productions
CBS Films – Dormant and absorbed into CBS Studios with the theatrical distribution moved to Paramount Pictures in 2019. 
 CBS Innertube
 CBS Justice (with AMC Networks International UK)
 CBS Productions – folded into CBS Studios
 CBS Records
 CBS Technology Center
 CBS Theatrical Films
 Cinema Center Films
 FindArticles
 GameRankings – Shut down on December 9, 2019, with its staff and older reviews being merged with Metacritic.
 King World Productions
 Camelot Entertainment Sales
 Eyemark Entertainment
 Group W Productions
 MaXam Entertainment
 King World Direct Inc.
 King World Merchandising, Inc.
 Paramount Stations Group
 Paramount Television
 Desilu Productions
 Viacom Enterprises
 Terrytoons
 Viacom Productions
 Viacom Pictures
 Scout.com
 Spelling Television
 Thomas-Spelling Productions
 Laurel Entertainment
 Worldvision Enterprises
 ABC Films
 Taft Entertainment Television
 QM Productions
 Schick Sunn Classic Productions
 Titus Productions
 Evergreen Programs, Inc.
 Worldvision Home Video LLC
 Charter Company
 Republic Pictures
 National Telefilm Associates
 Hollywood Television Service
 Studio City TV Productions
 NBC Films
 California National Productions
 U.M. & M. TV Corporation
 Spelling Daytime Television
 UPN
 Westinghouse Electric Corporation
 Westinghouse Broadcasting Company (Group W)
 InterStar Releasing (51% controlling stake)

Cable networks
 All News Channel (50% joint venture with Hubbard Broadcasting)
 Atom.com – absorbed into Comedy Central
 AddictingClips.com
 The Box
 CMT Films
 Comedy Central Films - folded into MTV Entertainment Studios
 Comedy Central Productions
 Defy Media (7%)
 AddictingGames
 Shockwave
 GoCityKids.com
 MTV Urge
 MTV Chi
 MTV Desi
 MTV K
 MTV SnowGlobe Music Festival
 Nick Games and Sports for Kids (Nick GaS) – TV Network
 Nickelodeon Magazine
 Nickelodeon on Sunset
 Nickelodeon Studios (theme park & productions)
 NickMom
 Nick Radio
 Nickelodeon Records
 NickRewind – TV block on TeenNick
 Quizilla
 VH1 Uno
 Viacom Music – music publisher affiliated with BMI
 Viacom NEXT
 World Sports Enterprises

International networks
 5Spike – succeeded by Paramount Network in 2020
 Kindernet
 TMF
 Spree TV (50%)
 VIVA
CBS Studios International
 Big CBS Prime (joint venture with Reliance Broadcast Network)
 Big CBS Love (joint venture with Reliance Broadcast Network)
 BIG CBS Spark (joint venture with Reliance Broadcast Network)
 CBS Action (joint venture with AMC Networks International)

Simon & Schuster
 Cash Money Content – a co-venture with Cash Money Records
 Karen Hunter Publishing
 Keywords Press
 Marble Arch Press – co-publishing agreement with the United Kingdom publisher Short Books
 Mercury Ink – co-publishing deal with Glenn Beck and Mercury Radio Arts
 MTV Books – young adult and pop-culture imprint of Gallery Books Group
 North Star Way Books – inspirational non-fiction imprint with additional services for authors
 Simon451 – speculative fiction and fantasy imprint

See also 
 National Amusements
 Lists of corporate assets
 List of libraries owned by Paramount Global

References 

Assets
Paramount
Paramount